Baisipalli Wildlife Sanctuary was created on 6 May 1981 and is located in Nayagarh, Odisha, India, adjacent to the Satkosia Gorge Wildlife Sanctuary.

The sanctuary is located where the Mahanadi River passes through a gorge in the Eastern Ghats mountains.

Baisipalli is located in the Eastern Highlands moist deciduous forests ecoregion. The two major plant communities are mixed deciduous forests including Sal (Shorea robusta) and riverine forest.

In 2007, the Satkosia Tiger Reserve was designated, which comprises Baisipali and the adjacent Satkosia Gorge Wildlife Sanctuary.

Due to its flora and fauna and beautiful landscapes, this sanctuary is an ideal tourist destination.

References

External links
 Sanctuaries at a Glance
 Baisipalli Wildlife Sanctuary at Orissa Forest Development Corporation

Eastern Highlands moist deciduous forests
Wildlife sanctuaries in Odisha
Nayagarh district
Protected areas established in 1981
1981 establishments in Orissa